Nick DeLuca (born January 27, 1995) is a former American football linebacker. He played college football at North Dakota State University, where he won four FCS National Championships.

Professional career

Tennessee Titans
DeLuca signed with the Tennessee Titans as an undrafted free agent on May 11, 2018. He was waived on August 12, 2018.

Jacksonville Jaguars
On August 21, 2018, DeLuca was signed by the Jacksonville Jaguars. He was waived on September 1, 2018 and was signed to the practice squad the next day. He was promoted to the active roster on October 22, 2018. On June 13, 2019, the Jaguars cut DeLuca.

Miami Dolphins
On August 2, 2019, DeLuca signed with the Miami Dolphins. He was waived on August 31, 2019.

New York Guardians
DeLuca was selected by the New York Guardians in the 25th Round (round five of phase three) of the 2020 XFL Draft. He was placed on the reserve/left squad list on February 25, 2020. He had his contract terminated when the league suspended operations on April 10, 2020.

References

External links
Jacksonville Jaguars bio
North Dakota State Bison bio

1995 births
Living people
American football linebackers
Jacksonville Jaguars players
Miami Dolphins players
New York Guardians players
North Dakota State Bison football players
Players of American football from Nebraska
Sportspeople from Omaha, Nebraska
Tennessee Titans players